Adriano Dayot Hernández (born Adriano Hernández y Dayot; September 8, 1870 – February 16, 1925) was a Filipino revolutionary, patriot, and military strategist during the Philippine Revolution and the Philippine–American War.

Early life
Hernández was born on September 8, 1870 to Fernando Hernández and Lucía Dayot, a member of the principalía class of Dingle, Iloilo. His maternal grandfather, Marcelino Dayot, and uncle, Luís Cantalicio Dayot, were gobernadorcillos of Dingle. He was a Spanish mestizo who studied at the Escuela Católica de Dingle (Dingle Catholic School) and later at the Ateneo Municipal in Manila. His elder brother, Gen. Julio D. Hernández, later became the Secretary of War of the Federal State of the Visayas during the revolutionary period. His two younger siblings were Consuelo and Pilar.

Military career

During the Philippine Revolution, Hernández organized a revolutionary movement in Iloilo against the Spanish colonial authorities and then from 1898, against the United States. He was a leader, along with his older brother Julio D. Hernández, and Nicolas Roces, of the Cry of Lincud which occurred on October 28, 1898 at Barrio Lincud in Dingle. This event is known today as the first armed uprising for independence in the province of Iloilo. He then became an aide to General Martín Delgado because of his knowledge in military strategy. He was designated Chief of Staff of the revolutionary government in the Visayas in November 1898 and represented the province of Iloilo at the Malolos Congress. During the Philippine–American War, Hernández led the guerrilla movement in the province until he surrendered.

Post-war life
Hernández was councilor of Silay, Negros Occidental from 1904 to 1906. In 1907, he became a member of the first Philippine Assembly, the first nationally elected legislative body in the Philippines, the lower house of the Philippine Legislature of the American colonial Insular Government. In 1912, he was elected Governor of Iloilo as a member of the Nacionalista Party. A practicing farmer, Hernández became the first Filipino director of the Bureau of Agriculture in 1916, which had been headed by Americans colonial officials before his tenure. This was part of the Filipinization policy of the American colonial government, following the Jones Act of 1916.

Hernández died on February 16, 1925.

Commemoration

 Camp General Adriano D. Hernandez in Dingle, Iloilo is named in his honor. It serves as headquarters of the 301st Infantry Brigade of the 3rd Infantry Division of the Philippine Army.
The Cry of Lincud Heroes memorial in Dingle, Iloilo was erected in his honor on the site of the initial uprising.
The Gen. Adriano D. Hernandez monument is a bronze monument located in the Dingle town plaza erected in his honor.

Personal life
Hernández married Carmen Gavira y Mapa and had six children with her: Lucía, Fernando, Alfonso, José, Ramona, and Guillermo. Lucía later married Ángel Manzano of Teverga, Spain while Fernando became Presiding Justice of the Court of Appeals. Alfonso, who was involved with the Bureau of Plant Industry, married Macandita Estrella Dayot, his father's first cousin. José, a national poet and writer in Spanish, was the 1927 Premio Zóbel awardee for his poem Lo que vimos en Joló y en Zamboanga. Ramona married Alejandro Legarda, Sr. The couple owned one of the first Art Deco houses in Manila built in 1937. Another son, Guillermo, was a Spanish, English, and Filipino sportscaster and sports editor. Hernández also had another daughter, Dolores Hernández y Dairo, who became a town councilor of Dingle.

Ancestry

References

External links
 General Adriano D. Hernandez on Historic Philippines

Hiligaynon people
People from Iloilo
Filipino generals
People of the Philippine Revolution
Members of the House of Representatives of the Philippines from Iloilo
Governors of Iloilo
1870 births
1925 deaths
Military strategists
Ateneo de Manila University alumni
Members of the Malolos Congress
Members of the Philippine Legislature
Filipino people of Spanish descent